Grace Mann Brown (April 16, 1859; Pippin, Wisconsin,1925; Denver, Colorado) was an American writer and spiritual leader. Her work was related to the New Thought Movement, Divine Science and Christian Science. Much of her work focused on spirituality, metaphysics, mysticism, esoteric and occult sciences.

Personal life 
Grace Mann Brown was the daughter of Major James Cook Mann (died October 30, 1897) and Mary Stem Mann. Brown was educated at Eden Hall in the Sacred Heart Convent in Torresdale, Pennsylvania.

Grace Mann married Joseph Lyman Brown (1851November 10, 1921) from Denver, Colorado, on October 20, 1878. He was an engineer at the Denver Gas and Electric Co. The couple had three children: Bernice Brown (1888–1937), who married a Mr. Keen; James Leslie Brown (May 10, 1891– ?), who became president of Thompson Manufacturing Co. in Denver; and Eunice Brown (1903–1945).

Brown died in 1925 and was buried in Fairmount Cemetery in Denver, Colorado.

Career 
Grace Mann Brown was active in the New Thought Movement, writing and lecturing extensively. She also wrote some of her works under the pen name Ione. She was instrumental in creating The Order of the Essenes and was its President. In 1906, Brown was Vice President of the World New Thought Federation.

Brown would succeed Fannie B. James as Editor of Fulfillment Magazine. Also, from 1920 to 1921, Brown was Bookkeeper for the American Unitarian Association. She founded the Modern Society of the Essenes: Essene Circle.

Writing

Books 
 Studies in Spiritual Harmony (as Ione; Reed Publishing Company, 1901–1903, 134 pages)
 Food Studies (as Ione; Denver, The Reed publishing company, 1902–1904  101 pages) 
 Seven Steps in the life of S. A. Weltmer (Nevada, Mo.: Weltmer Institute, 1906)
 Life Lessons: A Series of Practical Lessons of Life, from Life, and about Life (Hudson Press, 1906, 207 pages)
 Soul Songs by Ione  (Grace M. Brown, 1907)
 The Word made Flesh, A Study in Healing. (Grace M. Brown, 1908)  
 To-day; the Present Moment is God's Own Time (Grace M. Brown, 1910–1911, 200 pages)
 The Inner Breath; 'Vivenda Causa',  a revelation of old world wisdom in new world form. (Memphis, Tenn., The Business philosopher  (c. 1922) 4 p. 1., 7–182 p. 20 cm)
 Dollars and Health: concerning the psychology of the spleen and other things... (Written and published by Grace M. Brown, Denver [1915?). 20 pages Think Right for Health and Success (Edward J. Clode, 1916, 184 pages)
 Mental Harmony (Edward J. Clode, 1916, 195 pages)

 Articles in journals and magazines 

 The Essene – monthly magazine published by Brown, 1900–1917
 Fulfillment – monthly metaphysical magazine 1904–1907, later became the Weltmer MagazineUnity V.25
 "Practical Metaphysics" in The Herald of the Golden Age Vol. 10, No. 4 Oct 1905 p.69
 "The Greatest Thing" in Master Mind Magazine Vol. 3 of 15 Oct 1912 to March 1913 p. 153
 Washington News Letter several appearances.
 Now magazine, several appearances.
 The Modern World volume 9, page 128
 Mind Magazine volume 8, number 3, June 1901, p. 149
 The Balance from The Balance Publishing Co. Denver, Colo. A magazine of learning, of a standard 64p. monthly.

 Lectures 
Brown spoke at the Fifth Annual Convention of the New Thought Federation. The convention was held in Nevada, Missouri, on September 26–29, 1905. This town in western Missouri was the site for decades of the Weltmer Institute of Suggestive Therapeutics, related to the use of magnetism in healing. It had become a wellness center with numerous practitioners of related systems. Brown also gave a lecture entitled "Treasures" at the Unity Building Dedication Convention on Sunday, August 19, 1906.

 See also 
 Christian Science
 Church of Divine Science
 New Thought
 Unitarianism
 Sidney Abram Weltmer

References

 Sources 
 Who is Who in America 1914-1915
 Herringshaw's American Blue Book of Biography (Thomas William Herringsaw, 1914)
 Catalog of Copyright entries from 1900 to 1917 Referenced in Master Mind Magazines 1913-1914
 Other references can be found in the HATIHI TRUST Digital Library
 Denver Public Library Digital Collection, History, Genealogy, Ob, Cem,...

Further reading
 The Good Health Journal, November Number (1908) ed. J.H. Kellogg M.D.
 "The Essene Brotherhood, Vegetarian" in The Vegetarian Magazine'' (v.11 no.11 1909) relates information on The Essene Brotherhood of which Brown was a founder and leader.

External links 
 First Christian Science Church from Denver Public Library
 Divine Science Church from the Denver Public Library
 
 Joseph Lyman Brown, Find a Grave Website

1859 births
1925 deaths
19th-century Christian mystics
20th-century Christian mystics
American occultists
New Thought writers
American Christian mystics
Unity Church
New Thought mystics
American spiritual writers